The 2001 Ealing bombing was a terrorist attack in Ealing Broadway, London, England by the Real Irish Republican Army (RIRA), a splinter group of the Provisional Irish Republican Army (PIRA) that opposed the Good Friday Agreement.

History
On 3 August 2001, the Real IRA, a dissident Irish republican organisation and splinter of the Provisional IRA, detonated a car bomb containing  of homemade plastic explosives in Ealing Broadway, West London, England. The bomb was in a grey Saab 9000 near the train station, restaurants and pubs on Uxbridge Road, which exploded shortly after midnight, injuring seven people. The bomb was timed to target leaving karaoke pub-goers—but whilst most escaped injury, the explosion still caused significant damage to property, estimated to be around £200,000. The adjacent Ealing Broadway shopping centre was also damaged by flooding arising from the water main under the car bomb being ruptured.

Experts regarded the bomb to be designed to look spectacular on CCTV for the purposes of 'armed propaganda' rather than to cause large numbers of injuries. However, anti-terrorist detectives claimed that the attack was planned to be a massacre and to cause as much carnage as the Omagh bombing three years prior.

The bombing was the last successful Irish republican bombing on British soil outside Northern Ireland, of whom dissidents have waged an armed campaign since the Belfast peace agreement was signed in 1998, ending the Troubles.

Aftermath and conviction
The attack was condemned by Prime Minister Tony Blair, Sinn Féin leader Gerry Adams and others. It also came during a crucial time for the Northern Ireland peace process with disagreements regarding the Provisional IRA's decommissioning process. The attack came months after the Real IRA bombed the BBC Television Centre 3 miles away—a local MP claimed that west London residents felt "cold fury". Two days prior to the attack, a 20 kg Real IRA bomb was discovered at Belfast International Airport. After Ealing, the bombers targeted a new attack on Birmingham on 3 November, but which ultimately failed.

In November 2001, three men—Noel Maguire, Robert Hulme and his brother Aiden Hulme—were arrested in connection with the Ealing, BBC and Birmingham bomb attacks. They were all later convicted at the Old Bailey on 8 April 2003. Robert and Aiden Hulme were each jailed for 20 years. Noel Maguire, whom the judge said played "a major part in the bombing conspiracy", was sentenced to 22 years.

Two other men, James McCormack, of County Louth, and John Hannan, of Newtownbutler, County Fermanagh, had already admitted the charge at an earlier hearing. McCormack, who played the most serious part of the five, the judge said, was jailed for twenty-two years. John Hannan, who was seventeen at the time of the incidents, was given sixteen years' detention.

See also
 2000 MI6 attack
 Timeline of the Troubles
 List of terrorist incidents in London
 Colombia Three

Notes

External links
 AP News Archive video of amateur cameraman capturing the explosion live
 
 
 

2001 crimes in the United Kingdom
2001 in London
Attacks by Republicans since the Good Friday Agreement
Ealing bombing
Ealing bombing
21st century in the London Borough of Ealing
Car and truck bombings in London
Improvised explosive device bombings in London
Real Irish Republican Army actions
Terrorist incidents in London in the 2000s
Terrorist incidents in the United Kingdom in 2001